James W. Gerard (1867–1951) was an American lawyer and politician and US ambassador to Germany.

James Gerard may also refer to:
 Jim Gerard (Richard James Gerard; born 1936), New Zealand politician
 James Gerard (1741–1783), warden of Wadham College, Oxford

See also
 James Gerard Kennedy Sr. (1907–1997), founder of James G. Kennedy & Company
 Gerard James (disambiguation)